Itzalle or Izal is one of the villages that forms the municipality of Galoze in Zaraitzu, Navarre. The village contained 37 inhabitants in 2005.

Populated places in Navarre